Serhiy Mykhailovych Krukovets (born 1 July 1973) is a former Ukrainian professional footballer.

Club career
He made his professional debut in the Soviet Second League in 1990 for FC Volyn Lutsk. He played 1 game in the 1996–97 UEFA Cup for FC Torpedo-Luzhniki Moscow.

Honours
 Kazakhstan Premier League 3rd place: 2003.

References

1973 births
Living people
Soviet footballers
Footballers from Lutsk
Ukrainian footballers
Association football defenders
Ukrainian expatriate footballers
Expatriate footballers in Poland
Expatriate footballers in Russia
Expatriate footballers in Kazakhstan
Russian Premier League players
FC Volyn Lutsk players
FC Torpedo Moscow players
FC Torpedo-2 players
FC Lokomotiv Nizhny Novgorod players
FC Naftovyk-Ukrnafta Okhtyrka players
FC Spartak Ivano-Frankivsk players
FC Kuban Krasnodar players
FC Salyut Belgorod players
FC Zhenis Astana players
FC Nyva Vinnytsia players
Kazakhstan Premier League players
FC Yenisey Krasnoyarsk players
Sportspeople from Volyn Oblast